Ectoedemia rubivora is a moth of the family Nepticulidae. It is found from Fennoscandia to the Pyrenees, Italy and Serbia, and from Ireland to central Russia and Ukraine.

The wingspan is 4.6–6 mm. The head is black or sometimes a ferruginous-brown. Antennal eyecaps are white. The forewing ground colour is black and there is a somewhat bent shining silvery fascia hardly beyond middle ; outer half of cilia beyond a black line whitish. Hindwings  are grey. Adults are on wing from June to July. There is one generation per year.

The larvae feed on Rubus arcticus, Rubus caesius, Rubus chamaemorus, Rubus fruticosus and Rubus saxatilis. They mine the leaves of their host plant. The mine consists of  a highly contorted gallery, strongly widening towards the end. The frass in the second half of the gallery is dispersed. The larve mines venter upwards. There are several mines in a single leaf most of the time.

References

External links
Fauna Europaea
bladmineerders.nl
 ''Ectoedemia rubivora" at  Naturhistoriska riksmuseet
Ectoedemia rubivora images at  Consortium for the Barcode of Life
A Taxonomic Revision Of The Western Palaearctic Species Of The Subgenera Zimmermannia Hering And Ectoedemia Busck s.str. (Lepidoptera, Nepticulidae), With Notes On Their Phylogeny

Nepticulidae
Moths of Europe
Moths described in 1860